The eight-spotted skimmer (Libellula forensis) is a dragonfly of the skimmer family.

Description 
This dragonfly features the standard skimmer body form, and earns its name from the eight black markings on the wings. It is similar to the twelve-spotted skimmer, but lacks the black markings on the wing tips of that species. Males are additionally adorned with a total of eight opaque white spots. It can be found west of the Rocky Mountains near muddy bottomed ponds and lakes.
East of the Sierra Nevada Mountains, some females may also have white spots,
making them the only female dragonflies in North American with white spots on the wings.
The total length is 44 to 50 mm.
Flight season is April through October.

References

External links

 Libellula forensis on BugGuide.Net

Libellulidae
Odonata of North America
Insects of the United States
Fauna of the Western United States
Fauna of the California chaparral and woodlands
Fauna of the Rocky Mountains
Fauna of the Sierra Nevada (United States)
Insects described in 1861